Alex Polizzi: The Fixer is a business documentary show that aired on BBC Two from 2012 to 2015 and is presented by Alex Polizzi. The programme sees Alex turning around family businesses which are struggling for various reasons to attract customers.

Episodes

Transmissions

External links
 

2012 British television series debuts
BBC Television shows